Eumecosomyia nubila is a species of ulidiid or picture-winged fly in the genus Eumecosomyia of the family Ulidiidae. Its distribution includes parts of the United States, islands in the Caribbean, Central America, and South America.

References

Ulidiidae
Insects described in 1830